The 1928–29 French Rugby Union Championship of first division was won by Quillan, which defeated the Lézignan in the final.

The championship was contested by 40 clubs, divided into 8 pools of five.

First round

In bold the club qualified to next round

Second round

In bold the club qualified to next round

Quarterfinals

Semifinals

Final

Other competitions

In the French Championship "Honneur" (Second division), Roanne beat Olympique de Carmaux in the final, 11–0.

In the Promotion (3rd division), the FC Auscitain beat l'US, 6–3.

In Fourth Division, the Club Amical de Morcenx beat Saint-Marcellin, 16–0.

Le Stade Français was French Champion for 2nd XV, beating Biarritz, 3–0.

Sources 
 L'Humanité, 1928-1929
Compte rendu de la finale de 1929, sur lnr.fr
 finalesrugby.com

1929
France
Championship